The ugly worm lizard (Cynisca feae) is a species of amphisbaenian in the family Amphisbaenidae. The species is native to West Africa.

Etymology
The specific name, feae, is in honor of Leonardo Fea, who was an Italian explorer and naturalist.

Geographic range
C. feae is found in The Gambia, Guinea, Guinea-Bissau, and Senegal.

Habitat
The preferred natural habitat of C. feae is forest.

Description
It is pale brown dorsally, and white ventrally. It has a single series of wide median ventral segments, each of which is six times wider than long.

Behavior
C. feae is terrestrial and fossorial.

Reproduction
C. feae is oviparous.

References

Further reading
Boulenger GA (1906). "Report on the Reptiles collected by the late L. Fea. in West Africa". Annali del Museo Civico di Storia Naturale di Genova, Serie Terza [=Third Series] 2: 196–216. (Placogaster feae, new species, pp. 203–204, Figure 3, four views).
Gans C (1987). "Studies on Amphisbaenians (Reptilia). 7. The Small Round-headed Species (Cynisca) from Western Africa". American Museum Novitates (2896): 1–84. (Cynisca feae, new combination, pp. 35–37, Figure 17, three views).
Gans C (2005). "Checklist and Bibliography of the Amphisbaenia of the World". Bulletin of the American Museum of Natural History (289): 1–130. (Cynisca feae, p. 28).
Pauwels OSG, Meirte D (1996). "Contribution to the knowledge of the Gambian herpetofauna". British Herpetological Society Bulletin (56): 27–34.

Cynisca (lizard)
Reptiles described in 1906
Taxa named by George Albert Boulenger